Cornell is an unincorporated community in Modoc County, California.

A post office operated at Cornell from 1884 to 1904, with a closure during part of 1890.

References

Unincorporated communities in California
Unincorporated communities in Modoc County, California